Simon Paisley Day (born 13 April 1967), also credited as Simon Day, is an English stage and screen actor. His most recent work includes Timon of Athens (2008), Entertaining Mr Sloane (2009), Private Lives (2010), Twelfth Night (National Theatre, 2011), The Taming of the Shrew (Shakespeare's Globe, 2012) and portraying Sir Cosmo Duff Gordon in the 2012 ITV mini-series Titanic.

Early life 
Paisley Day was born in Gillingham, Kent. He read Drama and American Literature at the University of East Anglia in Norwich, England. Afterwards, Paisley Day undertook training at Bristol Old Vic for two years before embarking on a career as an actor.

Career
Paisley is a well-established theatre actor and has performed in plays such as The Taming of the Shrew, Hamlet, The Crucible and Troilus and Cressida. His television credits include Sherlock, Being Human, Midsomer Murders Doctor Who and Spartacus. His big-screen credits include The Eagle of the Ninth, The Queen of Sheba's Pearls and Churchill: The Hollywood Years.

Simon also was the leading and only character to appear in the very successful adverts for Honda, featuring Honda vehicles from different eras, with the Rhydian version of the song Rhydian.

Personal life
Paisley Day lives in Whitstable, with his wife and two children.

Film

Theatre

TV

References

External links

Simon Paisley Day – National Theatre biography

1967 births
Living people
Alumni of the University of East Anglia
20th-century English male actors
Male actors from Kent
People from Gillingham, Kent
21st-century English male actors
English male film actors
English male stage actors